Theodore Lewis may refer to:
 Theodore B. Lewis (1843–1899), early leader in the Church of Jesus Christ of Latter-day Saints
 Theodore G. Lewis (1890–1934), American lawyer and politician from Wisconsin
 Ted Lewis (computer scientist) (Theodore Gyle Lewis, born 1941), American computer scientist and mathematician

See also
 Ted Lewis (disambiguation)